Llandyfaelog Tre'r-graig (Anglicisation: Llandefaelog-tre'r-graig ), which is  from Cardiff, is a hamlet in the Felin-fach community of the Breconshire, South Powys area of Wales.  There are several forms of the name, including Llandefaelog Tre'r Graig (a 'Tre'r-graig' is added to distinguish between it and Llandyfaelog in Carmarthenshire), for the same reason sometimes referred to as Llandyfaelog Fach).

The village is named after St Tyfaelog.

It lies on the rural road between Talgarth to the north and Llanfihangel Talyllyn to the south. Other nearby villages include Loughstone.

References

Villages in Powys